Project Rocket/Fall Out Boy is a split EP by American rock bands Project Rocket and Fall Out Boy, released by Uprising Records in 2002. It was the first official release for both bands. The split EP has sold 25,000 copies in the United States as of August 2008, according to Billboard.

Background
This would be the first album for members of Fall Out Boy and Project Rocket to be done away from the hardcore style as opposed to their previous bands, though it still contains certain hardcore influences. Jared Logan played the drums for Fall Out Boy in the recording. Andy Hurley, the drummer for Project Rocket at the time, later agreed to drum part-time for Fall Out Boy before eventually joining full-time, after some lineup changes were made.

Re-releases
The tracks were reversed in the 2005 re-release of the album. Project Rocket's tracks came first, followed by those of Fall Out Boy. There is also an extremely rare reprint which features the front cover of the re-release, although without the "split ep" title; the track numbering on the case and CD are the same as the re-release but the tracks on the CD play in the order of the original pressing. Also, the track "Growing Up" is listed as "Growing" on top of the disc.

Fall Out Boy would later re-record their three songs from the EP for their following mini-LP Fall Out Boy's Evening Out with Your Girlfriend. Project Rocket also re-recorded "You Charlatan" for their album New Year's Revolution.

Track listing
Tracks 1–3 were written and arranged by Project Rocket; tracks 4–6 were written and arranged by Fall Out Boy.

Personnel
Adapted from liner notes

Fall Out Boy
Pete Wentz – bass guitar, backing vocals
T.J. Kunasch – rhythm guitar
Patrick Stump – lead vocals
Joe Trohman – lead guitar

Additional musicians:
Jared Logan – drums, production 

Project Rocket
T.J. Minich – lead vocals, rhythm guitar
Seth Lingebrigston – guitar
Andy Hurley – drums
Kyle Johnson – bass guitar, backing vocals

References

Fall Out Boy albums
Project Rocket albums
Split EPs
2002 debut EPs